Collins College was a for-profit college with an emphasis in the fields of visual arts and design.  Owned by Career Education Corporation, Collins College had two campuses. The main campus was located in Tempe, before moving to southeast Phoenix in 2009.   A smaller branch campus was located in west Phoenix from 2003 until circa 2012.

The school announced in December 2012 that it was shutting down and began a teach-out policy for existing students.

History

Al Collins Graphic Design School
Al and Florence Collins founded Al Collins Graphic Design School in 1978.

The school opened to a small group of students. Starting with a small evening program, in the early 1980s day classes were later added and larger facilities were obtained. In 1982, the school became accredited by the National Association of Trade and Technical Schools (NATTS). In 1985 the school moved to a larger campus in Tempe due to continued growth in its student population. The following year, a Computer Graphics program was added.

In 1987 the Arizona State Board for Private Post-secondary Education and NATTS granted the school the approval to offer an Associate of Arts (AA) degree in Graphic Design and in 1991, the Bachelor of Arts degree in Graphic Design. In 1997, programs in Multimedia Production and Digital Video Production were included, in addition to the Computer Graphics program. In 1998, the Associate of Occupational Studies degree in Animation was added.

Al Collins sold the school shortly after moving to the Tempe location.  The name was changed to Collins College during the Spring semester, 2001.

Department of Education scrutiny
The United States Department of Education conducted a 2003 Program Review of Collins College and found several serious problems with the school's administration of federal financial aid programs including: "many students failed to meet the attendance threshold...[and that the College's] practice of not considering failed courses as part of the [cumulative GPA] at the time that students fail the course...may...be falsely permitting those students to remain eligible for Title IV disbursements" and "Collins College had used "a coordinated subterfuge to under-report the effect" of federal financial aid dollars disbursed in order to show compliance with the so-called 90/10 Rule."

The issues with Collins College were a major contributing factor to the Department of Education's 2005 decision to prohibit its parent company, Career Education Corporation from expanding, a prohibition that was lifted in 2007.

Decline, move and closing
Between 2008 and 2009 the school dropped many degree programs and classes. The discontinued programs include the Associate of Science in Personal Computing/Network Technology, and the certificate programs of Interior Design, and Animation.

In January 2009 the majority of the main campus in Tempe was moved to a new location nearby in southeast Phoenix in the Cotton Center.

On December 3, 2012 Collins College closed down student applications and initiated a teach-out closing policy.

Alumni 
Notable alumni include Navajo artist Damian Jim.

References

External links
 School website
 Accrediting Commission of Career Schools and Colleges of Technology web site
 U.S. Department of Education, Program Review Report--Collins College, July 14. 2004

Defunct private universities and colleges in Arizona
Former for-profit universities and colleges in the United States
Film schools in Arizona
Graphic design schools in the United States
Educational institutions established in 1978
Universities and colleges in Phoenix, Arizona
1978 establishments in Arizona
Career Education Corporation
Educational institutions disestablished in 2012